Ferdinand En Avant, Huit Chansons en Huit Langues, often referred to as En Avant, is the second solo album by French avant-rock bass guitarist and composer, Ferdinand Richard. It was recorded in 1983 at Sunrise Studios in Kirchberg, Switzerland, and was released on LP record by the Recommended Records affiliated Swiss independent record label, RecRec Music the same year.

En Avant consists of eight avant-rock songs sung in English, Vietnamese, Arabic, Polish, Dioula, Spanish, French and German. The music was scored for two bass guitars and a cello by Richard, who also wrote the lyrics for, and sang seven of the eight songs. The lyrics for the songs on En Avant are printed in the album liner notes in English, French and German.

In 2001 the French independent record label, Orkhêstra reissued En Avant and Richard's previous solo album, En Forme!! on a single CD.

Background
Ferdinand Richard was the founding member of the French avant-rock group Etron Fou Leloublan in 1973, and was a member of a number of other musical ensembles, including Gestalt et Jive, Bruniferd and his own band, Ferdinand et les Philosophes. Richard also collaborated with English experimental guitarist Fred Frith from the English avant-rock group Henry Cow to record Dropera (1991), a "twisted rock opera".

Richard's first solo album, En Forme!! (1981) featured some of the members of Etron Fou Leloublan, which was still active at the time. On En Avant Richard explored his interest in language and culture, which developed during his studies of Medieval Literature at Grenoble in south-eastern France in the early 1970s. In the song "Victoire", sung in Arabic, Richard reflects on his childhood in Saint-Malo in north-western France. "Monsieur Blanc" (Mr. White) is a "surrealist fable" sung in the Dioula language of West Africa.

En Avant features Tom Cora from Skeleton Crew on cello, with Rick Brown from the V-Effect on drums on one of the tracks, and Christiane Cohade from Virgule 4 on bass guitar on two of the tracks. German poet and publisher Urs Engeler wrote the lyrics for, and sang the last song on the album, "Alltägliche Dinge".

Reception
In the September 2002 issue of Paris Transatlantic Magazine, Dan Warburton said in a review of the Orkhêstra CD reissue of En Avant, En Forme!! that it "stand[s] out a mile" in the "predominantly insipid if not downright dull world of French pop." He added that anyone "interested in how the intricacies of prog rock fused with the raw punch of punk" should investigate this album.

Andrew Jones in his book Plunderphonics, 'pataphysics & pop mechanics: an introduction to musique actuelle praised En Avant saying that the texts "show a deft juxtaposition of culture and tongue, and a poetic heart at work."

Track listing
All tracks composed by Ferdinand Richard except where noted.

Personnel
Ferdinand Richard – Fender 6-string bass, 4-string Music Master Special, vocals
Tom Cora – cello
Christiane Cohade – bass guitar on "Histoire des Meilleurs" and "Boire en Silence"
Rick Brown – drums on "Boire en Silence"
Urs Engeler – vocals on "Alltägliche Dinge"

Production
Recorded by Michel Engeli and Robert Vogel at Sunrise Studios, Kirchberg in Switzerland
Mixed Sunrise Studios, Kirchberg and Studio THC, Genova in Switzerland
Produced by Ferdinand Richard
Artwork by Peter Bäder

References

Works cited

External links

1983 albums
Experimental music albums
French-language albums
Spanish-language albums
Arabic-language albums
Polish-language albums
German-language albums
RecRec Music albums